Ryo Fukuda (福田良 Fukada Ryō, born June 26, 1979 in Fukuoka, Fukuoka) is a Japanese racecar driver. In the 2005–2006 season he raced in A1 Grand Prix Japan Team.

Fukuda started his career in France, at 1996 in Formula Campus, Formula Renault and Formula 3. In this category, after second place in 2000, in 2001 he became the French Formula Three champion with the Saulnier Racing team. In 2002 he was in Formula One BAR–Honda test driver, and also participated in one race in the Porsche Supercup and FIA GT Championship with Belmondo-Chrysler. Fukuda also participated in Formula Nippon in 2003, World Series Nissan in 2004, Formula Renault 3.5 Series in 2005 and 2006 with Saulnier Racing and Tech 1 Racing.

Racing record

Complete 24 Hours of Le Mans results

Complete Formula Nippon results
(key)

Complete Formula Renault 3.5 Series results
(key)

1979 births
Living people
Japanese racing drivers
Formula Nippon drivers
A1 Team Japan drivers
French Formula Three Championship drivers
Sportspeople from Fukuoka (city)
24 Hours of Le Mans drivers
World Series Formula V8 3.5 drivers
Porsche Supercup drivers
24 Hours of Spa drivers

Kondō Racing drivers
Tech 1 Racing drivers
OAK Racing drivers
La Filière drivers
A1 Grand Prix drivers
Carlin racing drivers